Goitseone Phoko (born 13 December 1994) is a Botswana footballer who currently plays for Gaborone United and the Botswana national football team as a goalkeeper.

Honours

Clubs
 Gaborone United
FA Cup:1
2019-20
Mascom Top 8 Cup:2
2012-13, 2014-15

Individual
Mascom Top 8 Cup Goalkeeper of the Tournament: 2015
Mascom Top 8 Cup Player of the Tournament: 2015
Orange FA Cup Goalkeeper of the Tournament: 2020

References 

Living people
1994 births
Botswana footballers
Gaborone United S.C. players
Association football goalkeepers